This is a list of Bien de Interés Cultural landmarks in the Province of Granada, Spain.

 Alhambra
 Gate of Elvira
 Gate of the "Granadas"
 Castillo de La Calahorra
 Castillo de Salobreña
 Castillo de San Miguel (Almuñécar)
 Gate of Bibrambla o Arco de las Orejas
 Gate of the Pomegranates

References 

 
Granada